William Walter Tyrell Stanford (1839–2 June 1880) was an Australian sculptor.

Stanford was born in London, England, son of Thomas Tyrell, contractor, and his wife Frances  Trevor. As a youth Stanford was apprenticed to a stonemason.

Stanford came to Victoria in 1852, probably as a ship's boy, and for a time worked on the gold diggings at Bendigo. In 1854 he was found guilty on a charge of horse-stealing and was sentenced to ten years imprisonment at HM Prison Pentridge, near Melbourne. After serving nearly six years, he was released on ticket of leave. On 1 May 1860 Stanford was found guilty on two charges of highway robbery and one of horse-stealing and sentenced to 22 years in prison. Afterward Stanford declared his innocence of two of the charges, and, in the charge of horse-thievery, he said was not the principal actor but assisted a fellow ex-prisoner. Stanford was again imprisoned at Pentridge, to become one of the most insubordinate of all the prisoners and thoroughly hardened.

The chaplain was impressed Stanford's drawings on a slate and carved bone figure. The carving was shown to Colonel Champ, governor of the prison, who offered Stanford the opportunity to create more art if he promised to improve his behaviour. The chaplain gained permission for Charles Summers to teach Stanford modelling. Later Stanford submitted a design for a fountain which was approved. He only had local bluestone from the prison quarry for construction. Stanford worked for four years on it and became exemplary in his conduct. Summers told his friends about it and many appeals were made for the release of the prisoner. Stanford was "discharged to freedom by remission" in October 1871, the fountain was set up in the triangular piece of ground between Parliament House and the treasury building, and there Stanford gave it its finishing touches. It is an excellent piece of design, amazingly successful when the conditions under which it was produced are considered.

Stanford became a monumental mason at Windsor, a suburb of Melbourne. There he married and was respected and liked by his neighbours. His business was successful and he made a reputation for his carved headstones. One of these may be seen on the main drive of the St Kilda Cemetery not far from the gate. Another example of his work is on his wife's grave at the Melbourne cemetery. Stanford died of "ulceration of the stomach" on 2 June 1880 at Prahran, partly from the effects of inhaling the fine dust while working on the fountain.

References

Monumental masons
1839 births
1880 deaths
19th-century Australian sculptors